The Maryville Limestone is a geologic formation in Tennessee. It preserves fossils dating back to the Cambrian period.

See also

 List of fossiliferous stratigraphic units in Tennessee
 Paleontology in Tennessee

References
 

Cambrian geology of Tennessee
Cambrian southern paleotemperate deposits